Smbat VIII Bagratuni or Smbat the Confessor was an Armenian noble of the Bagratid (Bagratuni) family and one of the most important princes (nakharar) of Armenia in the mid-9th century as the commander-in-chief (sparapet) of Armenia. Taken prisoner to Samarra, he was pressured to convert to Islam but refused and died there. He was the father of Ashot I of Armenia, founder of the Bagratid Kingdom of Armenia.

Life
Smbat was the younger son of Ashot IV Bagratuni, who by the time of his death in 826 had come to control a large part of Armenia, and was recognized by the Abbasid caliphs as presiding prince (ishkhan) of Armenia. 

After his death, Smbat and his older brother Bagrat divided their father's inheritance between them: Bagrat took the regions of Taron, Khoith and Sassoun, i.e. the family's domains on the Upper Euphrates, while Smbat received the ancestral lands around Bagaran and the Araxes river. In a calculated effort to keep the two brothers divided, the Abbasid government divided Ashot's authority and conferred on Smbat the title of commander-in-chief (sparapet) and ruler of Shirak, while Bagrat was named presiding prince four years after his father's death. Abbasid calculations proved correct, as the two brothers spent much time quarrelling with each other. In 841, for instance, Bagrat had the Armenian bishops depose the Catholicos of Armenia, John IV, but he was promptly re-installed in his see by Smbat with the assistance of the other princes.

Nevertheless, the Armenian princes were able to use the Caliphate's preoccupation with the Khurramite rebellion of Babak Khorramdin to achieve a significant degree of autonomy during this period. Smbat, who had spent time at the caliphal court as a hostage, was more circumspect about openly challenging Arab power than his brother, but both were ultimately too weak to seriously threaten Abbasid predominance for the time being. When Khalid ibn Yazid al-Shaybani, who in his previous tenures had become enormously unpopular among both the Christian and the Arab princes of the country, was appointed as caliphal governor in 841, Smbat led the reaction against him.  The rebels achieved his recall by the Caliph and his replacement with the weaker and more pliant Ali ibn Husayn, to whom the Armenians not only refused to hand over the expected taxes, but whom they promptly blockaded in his capital, Bardaa. When Caliph al-Wathiq reappointed Khalid as governor, Smbat was again at the forefront of a revolt against him, alongside the Muslim rebel Sawada ibn Abd al-Hamid al-Jahhafi and Sahak, Prince of Syunik. The rebels were heavily defeated at the Battle of Kawakert, however. 

Like all prominent nakharar, he was taken captive by Bugha al-Kabir when he invaded Armenia in 853–855. Many of the nakharar converted to Islam to save their lives, but Smbat did not. He is venerated as a confessor for the faith by the Armenian Church.

Smbat's son Ashot V Bagratuni succeeded his father as sparapet. In 862 Ashot also became "prince of princes", leading eventually to his establishment of the virtually independent Bagratid Kingdom of Armenia in 884.

References

Sources
 
 

9th-century deaths
9th-century Armenian people
Bagratuni dynasty
9th-century rulers in Asia
Prisoners and detainees of the Abbasid Caliphate
Rebellions against the Abbasid Caliphate
Vassal rulers of the Abbasid Caliphate